Valserhône is a commune in the Ain department in the Auvergne-Rhône-Alpes region in Eastern France. It is the result of the merger, on 1 January 2019, of the communes of Bellegarde-sur-Valserine, Châtillon-en-Michaille and Lancrans. In 2018, the three communes had a combined population of 16,431, with Bellegarde-sur-Valserine as the major population centre. This makes Valserhône the third-most populated commune of Ain, after Bourg-en-Bresse and Oyonnax.

Geography
Valserhône is located at the confluence of the Valserine and the Rhône. It was named after the two rivers. The commune is part of Haut-Jura Regional Natural Park.

The commune has a station, which is located at the junction of three railway lines and has regular service to various destinations in France and Switzerland.

Climate
Valserhône has a oceanic climate (Köppen climate classification Cfb).

Population

See also 
 Communes of the Ain department

References

Communes of Ain
Communes nouvelles of Ain
Populated places established in 2019
2019 establishments in France